1980 saw the 5th edition of the Saudi Premier League.

The league title was won once again by Al-Nassr for the third time.

Newly promoted sides Al-Riyadh and Al Jabalain were notionally relegated, though the first division and premier league would merge for the 1981–82 season, keeping them in the top flight for that year.

Stadia and locations

League table

Promoted Al Rouda, Al-Wahda.
Full records are not known at this time

External links 
 RSSSF Stats
 Saudi Arabia Football Federation
 Saudi League Statistics
 Article writer for Saleh Al-Hoireny - Al-Jazirah newspaper 20-08-2010

1980-81
Professional League
Saudi Professional League